Killer Instinct, also called Homicidal Impulse, is a 1992 film written and directed by David Tausik.

Plot
A young lawyer has problems with a case that he's been working on for over a year. The district attorney's niece helps him by first blackmailing, then plotting the murder of the D.A., while having a sexual relationship with the young lawyer, who eventually discovers the truth about her.

Principal cast

 Scott Valentine as Tim Casey 
 Vanessa Angel as Deborah Walker
 Talia Balsam as Emma
 Brian Cousins as Kent 
 Kevin West as Egghead

References

External links 

1992 films
1992 directorial debut films
Films produced by Roger Corman
1990s English-language films